Brian Mullins may refer to:
 Brian Mullins (1954-2022), Irish Gaelic football player and manager 
 Brian Mullins (hurler) (born 1978), Irish hurler